Kanal (also Romanized as Kānāl) is a village in Qorqori Rural District, Qorqori District, Hirmand County, Sistan and Baluchestan Province, Iran. At the 2006 census, its population was 664, in 131 families.

References 

Populated places in Hirmand County